BRP Bagong Lakas (PB-102) is the second ship of the Kagitingan class coastal patrol interdiction crafts of the Philippine Navy. It was designed and built in Germany, and was commissioned with the Philippine Navy in February 1979 as RPS Bagong Lakas (P-102).

It was renamed to BRP Bagong Lakas (PG-102) in 1980, and was again reclassified to BRP Bagong Lakas (PB-102) in April 2016 under the new classification standards of the Philippine Navy classifying it as a patrol boat.

Design
The boat and all the ships in its class was considered to be unsuccessful, and was originally designed to have a maximum speed of 28 knots, but the design failed to achieve the said speed as it was underpowered.

The boat was installed with the Selenia Orion RTN-10X fire control radar and Selenia Elsag NA-10 Mod.0 gunfire control system, but it appears that they have been removed.

References

Ships of the Philippine Navy